Blair Babes or Blair's Babes is a term sometimes used to refer to the 101 female Members of Parliament (MPs) from the Labour Party elected to the British House of Commons in Labour's landslide general election victory in 1997, after images of the new Prime Minister Tony Blair with 96 of them on the steps of Church House in Westminster were widely publicised. The photographs have been called "infamous". The phrase is attributed to the Daily Mail. The term "Blair's Babes" has been criticised as trivialising women in politics, and the group of women MPs to which it referred have been studied as a group.

The record-breaking number of new women MPs

The 1997 general election saw more women elected to the House of Commons than ever – 120, exactly double the 60 elected at the 1992 general election.  Aside from the 101 Labour MPs, there were also 13 Conservatives, three Liberal Democrats, and three from other parties (including Speaker Betty Boothroyd, previously a Labour politician). However, many of the new female MPs grew disillusioned, and nine either chose not to stand or lost their seats in the 2001 general election. Despite two female MPs winning by-elections between 1997 and 2001, and other women being elected, the total number of female MPs fell to 118 at the 2001 general election. A further 22 stood down or lost their seats at the 2005 general election, although the number of female MPs increased again to a new record of 127.

Perception of Blair's Babes

According to The Times, Margaret Moran, MP for Luton South, described the "perception that the 1997 intake of female Labour MPs are all robotic clones" as "complete tosh". Moran said that she herself was not a Blair Babe, but a "Blair Witch". The columnist Polly Toynbee condemned the term as a "casual, misogynist tag."

Implications of the term

The sociological implications of the term and the experiences of Labour's women MPs were extensively analysed by Sarah Childs in her 2004 book New Labour's Women MPs: Women Representing Women. It has been identified as a trivialising way to refer to women in politics. Tony Blair's wife Cherie Blair did not like the term. Margaret Moran said it should not be used. The term has also been used within Parliament to stigmatise some women MPs, separating "young attractive" Blair's Babes from "brainy babe[s]".

Some of the group believe that the term was harmful to their ability to bring about change, and that it encouraged a focus on their appearance. It has been reported that the Daily Mail used the term "to challenge Labour's claim that having 101 women MPs would make a difference".

The experiences of Blair's Babes as a group

This group of women MPs has sometimes been used as a way to examine women MPs' experiences in Parliament, as in a Guardian article by Rachel Cooke in 2007. Cooke's interviews of ten of the women found that some of them had experienced bullying, sexism and cliques in Parliament, as well as working hours that conflicted with family life. They have also been the subject of "where are they now?" articles.

The journalist Lucy Ward has written of the group,

As of the 2019 general election, there are ten Blair Babes left in the House of Commons, out of a total of 219 women MPs.

List of Blair babes

References

Further reading

"The Babe who fell from grace", The Daily Telegraph, 9 February 2007
Blair's Babes: Critical Mass Theory, Gender, and Legislative Life, Pippa Norris and Joni Lovenduski, 2001 (PDF)
Social background of MPs, Parliament, Standard Note 1528, 17 November 2005 (PDF)

See also 
Tony's Cronies

1997 United Kingdom general election
1997 in the United Kingdom
Lists of women legislators in the United Kingdom
Lists of MPs elected in United Kingdom general elections
Lists of United Kingdom MPs
New Labour
Political terms in the United Kingdom
Tony Blair
History of women in the United Kingdom
Women in the United Kingdom